The year 2000 in architecture involved some significant architectural events and new buildings.

Events
June 22 – The Architect company Snøhetta wins the international Architect competition for Oslo's New National Opera House.
Holy Trinity Column in Olomouc is inscribed on the UNESCO World Heritage List.
Greenwich Millennium Village in London designed by Ralph Erskine.

Buildings and structures

Buildings opened

 
February 19 – Rose Center for Earth and Space in New York City, USA, designed by Polshek Partnership Architects.
March 8 – Peckham Library in London, UK, designed by Alsop and Störmer. It wins this year's Stirling Prize.
May 12 – Tate Modern in London, a conversion of Bankside Power Station by Herzog & de Meuron.
October 12 – The Lowry theatre and gallery centre in Salford, England, designed by Michael Wilford and Buro Happold.
August – Centro Brasileiro Britânico in São Paulo, designed by Marc Rabin.
August 19 – Cathedral of Christ the Saviour in Moscow, Russia, reconstructed to Konstantin Thon's 1832 design, is dedicated.
October 25 – Judenplatz Holocaust Memorial unveiled in Vienna, designed by Rachel Whiteread.
date unknown
Emirates Towers in Dubai, United Arab Emirates.
Sony Center, Potsdamer Platz in Berlin, Germany, designed by Helmut Jahn.
Diamond Ranch High School in Pomona, California, USA, designed by Thom Mayne of Morphosis.
Museum of Pop Culture in Seattle, USA, designed by Frank Gehry.
Sibelius Hall in Lahti, Finland, designed by Kimmo Lintula and Hannu Tikka.

Buildings completed
May 14 – Al Faisaliyah Center in Riyadh, Saudi Arabia, designed by Foster and Partners, the first building to be completed in a competition between two Saudi princes; the Kingdom Centre is completed in 2002.
Bankers Hall West in Calgary, Alberta, designed by Cohos Evamy.
Montevetro (apartments), Battersea Reach, London, designed by Richard Rogers Partnership.

Awards
AIA Gold Medal – Ricardo Legorreta
Architecture Firm Award – Gensler
Emporis Skyscraper Award – Sofitel New York Hotel
Grand Prix de l'urbanisme – Alexandre Chemetoff
Praemium Imperiale Architecture Laureate – Richard Rogers
Pritzker Prize – Rem Koolhaas
Prix de l'Équerre d'Argent – Philippe Gazeau
RAIA Gold Medal – John Morphett
RIBA Royal Gold Medal – Frank Gehry
Stirling Prize – Alsop & Störmer, Peckham Library
Thomas Jefferson Medal in Architecture – Daniel Patrick Moynihan
Twenty-five Year Award – The Smith House
Vincent Scully Prize – Jane Jacobs

Deaths
January 18 – Margarete Schütte-Lihotzky, Austrian architect in the Nazi Resistance movement (born 1897)
February 19 – Friedensreich Hundertwasser, Austrian artist and architect (born 1928)
July 3 – Enric Miralles, Spanish architect (born 1955)
July 29 – Eladio Dieste, Uruguayan engineer and architect (born 1917)

See also
Timeline of architecture

References

20th-century architecture
2000 architecture